Igor Yevgenyevich Gileb (born 13 April 1951) is a Russian football coach and a former player.

External links
 

1951 births
Living people
Soviet footballers
FC Dynamo Stavropol players
Russian football managers
FC Dynamo Stavropol managers
Association football defenders